Marie-Pier Préfontaine (born 18 October 1988) is a Canadian alpine skier.

She competed at the 2010 Winter Olympics in Vancouver in the women's giant slalom competition.

References

External links
 Marie-Pier Préfontaine at the 2010 Winter Olympics

1988 births
Alpine skiers at the 2010 Winter Olympics
Canadian female alpine skiers
Living people
Olympic alpine skiers of Canada
People from Sainte-Agathe-des-Monts
Alpine skiers at the 2014 Winter Olympics
21st-century Canadian women